Auriac-l'Église is a commune in the Cantal department in the Auvergne region of south-central France.

Gerography
Auriac-l'Église is located in the Sianne valley east of the Cézallier mountains some 20 km west of Brioude and 7 km north-west of Massiac. The northern and north-eastern border of the commune is also the border between Cantal and Haute-Loire departments. Access to the commune is by road D9 from Allanche in the south-west  which passes through the north of the commune just north of the village and continues north, changing to road D20 at the border. The D21 comes from Massiac in the east changing to the D55 at the border and continuing through the village west to join the D9 west of the commune. The D355 goes south from the village to join the D21 which forms the southern border of the commune. Apart from the village there are the hamlets of Alagnon, Serre, Auriac Bas, and Chaselles. The commune is mixed forest on the slopes and farmland on the plain.

The Sianne river flows through the commune from south-west to north-east before it continues north to join the Alagnon west of Servières. Many tributaries join the Sianne in the commune including the Ruisseau de l'Église, the Ruisseau des Rifs, the Ruisseau de la Bastide, the Ruisseau de Gargaure, the Ruisseau de Fraissinet, The Ruisseau de Balain, and the Ruisseau de Larbounet.

Neighbouring communes and villages

History
In 1855 Friar John Rives of the order of Friars of Saint-Viateur founded a communal school.

In 1899 Friar Camille Mizoule, teacher in Auriac-l'Église and author of  La Bretagne à Vol d'oiseau (Brittany Bird Flight) (1898) as well as winner of the Muses armoricaines et Vendéennes award, published a book of poetic essays entitled Auvergne and Brittany.

In 1962 Alphonse Vinatié, (1924-2005), a teacher in the Auriac-l'Église public school and an archaeologist, discovered one of the largest necropolis in France: proto-historic burial mounds in Laurie.

Administration

List of Successive Mayors

Demography
In 2017 the commune had 153 inhabitants.

Culture and heritage

Civil heritage
The Motte-and-bailey castle of Chavagnac
The Dry stone terraces dating from the 19th century, they are located along the edge of the commune and are the remains of the former wine culture. They are called in the local language Pailhas.
The Château de la Gironde, the remains from the 14th and 18th centuries.
The Fortified Chateau of Pouzac, a ruined fortified chateau.
The Old antimony mine, galleries at Riol hamlet.
Old Houses
Old ovens, one in the hamlet of Chazelles (demolished in 2002); one in the hamlet of Serre.
Old Dovecote.
Mills at Riol and Croze. In 1816 Father Jean-Baptiste Vigouroux (1816-1898) was born in the Riol Mill. He founded  the first Catholic mission in New Caledonia in 1851 and, on 24 August 1853, signed the act of possession by France of New Caledonia.
Gallo-Roman-style Bridge on the Sianne, built in 1897 at Vernède to access 7 properties.
Sianne Camping ground, the municipal campground with 30 spots located next to the river: 0.76 hectares, 1 star.

Religious heritage

The Church of Saint Nicolas (12th century) is registered as an historical monument.
A Cross in the Church Square, placed there in 1899.

Village life
The Activity and Cultural Committee of Auriac-l’Église (CAC)

Notable people linked to the communeJean-Baptiste Vigouroux (1816-1898), ordained a priest in 1842, he joined the order of Marist missionaries in 1848. He founded the first Catholic mission in New Caledonia in 1851 and signed the act of possession for France of New Caledonia on 24 August 1853. Author of plans for the new small seminary of Saint-Flour. He died at Saint-Louis (New Caledonia) in 1898.Alphonse Vinatié' (1924-2005). He was a teacher and amateur archaeologist. He conducted numerous excavations in northern Cantal and discovered several archaeological sites. A street in Auriac bears his name. He was a teacher in Auriac-l'Église from 1950 to 1963.

See also
Communes of the Cantal department

BibliographyOur Auvergne ancestors, Auvergne immigration to Brittany'', Serge Duigou, Éditions Ressac, Quimper, 2004.  [on the subject of the migratory movement from the Cézallier region towards Brittany in the 18th and 19th centuries - notably Auriac with Andraud, Bourse, Boyé, etc.]

References

External links
Official website 
Auriac-l'Église on the old IGN website 
Auriac-l'Église on Géoportail, National Geographic Institute (IGN) website 
Auriac-l'Église on the 1750 Cassini Map

Communes of Cantal